"Stutter Rap (No Sleep til Bedtime)" is a song by Morris Minor and the Majors, led by Tony Hawks. The song is a stylistic parody of the Beastie Boys, and the subtitle plays on their 1987 single "No Sleep till Brooklyn". The record sold 220,000 copies.

Hawks started out as a songwriter but was not successful, and instead became a comedian and writer. However, in turning to comedy he achieved a hit with "Stutter Rap", which reached No. 4 in the UK Singles Chart, No. 14 in Canada and No. 2 in Australia. It was written by Hawks, and performed by him along with two others. In the video for the song, John Deacon (of Queen) makes an appearance, wearing a blue wig and playing guitar.

The song was coupled with "Another Boring B-Side", whose chorus simply repeated the line: "Very very very very very very boring".

Melody Maker reviewed the single with the four words "Stutter Rap, Utter Crap".

In its original form the track had a brief two second sample of the theme to the TV series Neighbours at the 1:39 mark, but on the follow-up single "This Is the Chorus" and some compilations this was replaced with a different and unidentified sample with female vocals.

Charts

Weekly charts

Year-end charts

References

External links
 Tony-Hawks.com (Official website of Tony Hawks)

1987 singles
1987 songs
Stuttering
Songs about sleep
Musical parodies
Morris Minor and the Majors songs